The 1933 U.S. Open was the 37th U.S. Open, held June 8–10 at North Shore Country Club in Glenview, Illinois, a suburb northwest of Chicago.  Amateur Johnny Goodman outlasted Ralph Guldahl by a single stroke to win his only major championship.

Goodman's victory  was the eighth and most recent by an amateur at the U.S. Open; Bobby Jones won four, the last in 1930 was part of his grand slam.

Goodman, an Omaha insurance salesman, opened with a 75 (+3), which put him seven strokes off the lead held by 1927 champion Tommy Armour. His second round was one for the record books, as he tied Gene Sarazen's tournament record with a 66 (−6). Following a third round 70 in which he needed just 28 putts, Goodman had a six-stroke lead over Guldahl.

After opening the final round with a par, eagle, and birdie, Goodman's play suddenly declined as he shot six over par for the next six holes; the lead was reduced to two strokes at the turn. Goodman bounced back and recorded four consecutive pars, then bogeyed 14, birdied 15, and  bogeyed 17. A par at the last gave him a 76 and a 287 total. At the final hole, Guldahl found a greenside bunker and missed the  putt to save par that would have forced a Sunday playoff. Brothers Mortie and Olin Dutra of California placed in the top ten at sixth and seventh, respectively. Olin won the title the next year at Merion, near Philadelphia.

A number of amateurs came close to winning majors in the generation after Goodman's victory. Frank Stranahan tied for second at the 1947 Open Championship and 1953 Open Championship. Ken Venturi, age 24, led the Masters in 1956 for the first three rounds but finished runner-up by a stroke. At the 1960 U.S. Open 20-year-old Jack Nicklaus of Ohio State led midway through the final round and finished runner-up, two strokes back. The final runner-up finish for an amateur was at the 1961 Masters Tournament when Charles Coe tied for second with Arnold Palmer. However Goodman was the last amateur to ever win a major championship. The most recent top ten finish at the U.S. Open by an amateur was in 1971 when 54-hole leader Jim Simons of Wake Forest placed fifth.

Goodman's only other top ten finish at the U.S. Open was in 1937, in eighth place as low amateur; he won the U.S. Amateur championship later that year.

Past champions in the field

Made the cut 

Source:

Missed the cut 

Source:

Round summaries

First round
Thursday, June 8, 1933

Source:

Second round
Friday, June 9, 1933

Source:

Third round
Saturday, June 10, 1933 (morning)

Source:

Final round
Saturday, June 10, 1933 (afternoon)

Source:
(a) denotes amateur

Scorecard

Final round

Cumulative tournament scores, relative to par
{|class="wikitable" span = 50 style="font-size:85%;
|-
|style="background: Red;" width=10|
|Eagle
|style="background: Pink;" width=10|
|Birdie
|style="background: PaleGreen;" width=10|
|Bogey
|style="background: Green;" width=10|
|Double bogey
|}
Source:

References

External links
USGA Championship Database
USOpen.com - 1933

U.S. Open (golf)
Golf in Illinois
Glenview, Illinois
U.S. Open
U.S. Open
U.S. Open
U.S. Open